Cenobio Paniagua y Vásques (September 30, 1821, Tlalpujahua, Michoacán – November 2, 1882, Córdoba, Veracruz) was a Mexican composer.

Paniagua completed his studies in violin and became the Second Conductor of the Cathedral Orchestra of Mexico City.  He founded a music academy in the city.  Later, he lived in Havana, and after 1868, in Córdoba.

He composed several operas, including Catalina de Guisa which was the first Mexican opera seria, the oratorio Tobías, as well as seventy masses, and also produced writings on music theory.

Sources

1821 births
1882 deaths
19th-century classical composers
19th-century conductors (music)
Mexican classical composers
Mexican conductors (music)
Male conductors (music)
Mexican male classical composers
Mexican Romantic composers
Musicians from Michoacán
Mexican opera composers
Male opera composers
People from Tlalpujahua